Cathedral of the Assumption is a Roman Catholic cathedral in Rožňava, Slovakia. It is the seat of Bishop of Rožňava.

History
The Gothic church was completed in 1304. At the turn of the 15th century, the church underwent comprehensive rebuilding. During the 16th and 17th centuries the church was used by both Catholics and Protestants. With the establishment of the Episcopal See of Rožňava on 13 March 1776, the church became the cathedral of the new diocese. As a result, extensive interior modifications were made. The church was originally built without a tower, which was added in the 19th century. It is a typical example of a regional style, so-called Gemer classicism.

Rožňavská metercia 
In the interior of the church there is a late Gothic painting of St. Anne along with Mary, mother of Jesus and the child Jesus. The background depicts processes of mining and processing of ore, which were activities undertaken in the Gemer region at the time.

Bells 

Roman Catholic cathedrals in Slovakia
Churches in Košice Region
14th-century Roman Catholic church buildings in Slovakia

de:Kathedrale Mariä Himmelfahrt